Kariz-e Sabah (also Romanized as Kārīz-e Şabāḩ) is a village in Darbqazi Rural District, in the Central District of Nishapur County, Razavi Khorasan Province, Iran. At the 2006 census, its population was 434, in 107 families.

References 

Populated places in Nishapur County